Ummeed is a Bollywood film. It was released in 1941. It was directed by  Manibhai Vyas and starred Ishwarlal and Dixit in the lead roles.

References

External links
 

1941 films
1940s Hindi-language films
Indian black-and-white films
Indian comedy-drama films
1941 comedy-drama films